Wilhelm Haferkamp (1 July 1923 – 17 January 1995) was a longtime member of the European Commission. Born in Germany, he was a social democratic politician. He was appointed to the commission by the West German government in 1967. He served in a number of posts including Vice President until 1985. He died in Brussels.

In the Rey Commission from 1967 he served as Commissioner for Energy. His portfolio then expanded to include the Internal Market in 1970 under the Malfatti Commission and Mansholt Commission until 1973 when he joined the Ortoli Commission as Commissioner for Economic, Finance, Credit and Investments. His last post was Commissioner for External Relations, which he served as until 1985 under the Jenkins and Thorn Commissions.

References 

|-

|-

|-

1923 births
1995 deaths
German European Commissioners
Grand Crosses with Star and Sash of the Order of Merit of the Federal Republic of Germany
European Commissioners 1967–1970
European Commissioners 1970–1972
European Commissioners 1972–1973
European Commissioners 1973–1977
European Commissioners 1977–1981
European Commissioners 1981–1985